Trumbull is an unincorporated community in Ellis County, Texas, United States.

Geography

History
In 1872, the Houston and Texas Central Railway developed a railroad switch south of Dallas, along its 1872 rail line extension from Houston to Dallas. Known simply as "Switch", the area would later be called by a variety of names: "Ghost Hill", then "Mackie", then "Clemma", before becoming "Trumbull" in 1904. A post office was established in 1896, but was discontinued in 1967.

Education
Trumbull is serviced by the Ferris Independent School District.

References 

Unincorporated communities in Ellis County, Texas
Unincorporated communities in Texas